Bruce Mark Saunders is an Australian politician. He has been the Labor member for Maryborough in the Queensland Legislative Assembly since 2015.

Saunders owns and operates a gelato shop, Scoops on Bazaar, in the city of Maryborough, which opened in December 2013.

Saunders was re-elected at the 2017 election, obtaining a 20.2% swing in his favour at an election in which the Labor vote stalled or went backwards in most country seats.

References

Year of birth missing (living people)
Living people
Members of the Queensland Legislative Assembly
Australian Labor Party members of the Parliament of Queensland
21st-century Australian politicians